The 2014 Judo Grand Prix Düsseldorf was held in Düsseldorf, Germany from 21 to 23 February 2014.

Medal summary

Men's events

Women's events

Source Results

Medal table

References

External links
 

2014 IJF World Tour
2014 Judo Grand Prix
Judo
Grand Prix Düsseldorf 2014
Judo
Judo